The 2019 Tour de la Provence was a road cycling stage race that took place between 14 and 17 February 2019. The race was rated as a 2.1 event as part of the 2019 UCI Europe Tour, and was the fourth edition of the Tour de la Provence.

The race was won by Spanish rider Gorka Izagirre of the  team, winning by less than a second ahead of Australian rider Simon Clarke.

Teams
Twenty-two teams of up to seven riders started the race:

Route

Stages

Stage 1

Stage 2

Stage 3

Stage 4

Classifications

Classification leadership table

References

2019
2019 UCI Europe Tour
2019 in French sport
February 2019 sports events in France